Keep Music Miserable is a double album by the English band Lowgold of B-sides, live and unreleased tracks, released in 2005 on the band's own record label Dedted Records. No singles were taken from the album.

Track listing
All songs written by Darren Lee Ford.

CD1
"Every Train"
"Please Be Good To Me"
"Make Over, Make Up"
"End Of The Hammer"
"Time Reclaims All Frontiers"
"Flavour"
"Burn A Hole"
"The Feelings (Extended Studio Mix)"
"Eddie Lejeune"
"If People Were Vinyl (Feat. Tux)"
"Beauty Dies Young (Graham Coxon Mix)"
"See How The World’s Moved On"
"Miles Is My Favourite"

CD2
"I’d Rather Fuck Up Than Miss Out"
"Remission Time"
"Can’t Say No"
"Whatever You Think You’re Wrong"
"The Third One"
"Coming On Strong"
"Silver Ocean"
"B Land"
"Atlantic Pacific"
"God Willing"
"Do Not Deny Your Own Happiness"
"Beauty Dies Young (Live)"
"Never Alone (Live)"
"Absolute Exocet"
"Hip Hop Cooperative"
"Jacob’s Ping Pong"

Personnel
 Tony Lash – producer, drums
 Darren Ford – guitar, vocals, drums
 Dan Symons – guitar
 Miles Willey – bass guitar
 Simon Scott – drums, backing vocals

References

2005 albums
Lowgold albums